Rue Royale (French for "Royal Street") may refer to several streets:

Rue Royale, Brussels, Belgium
Rue Royale, Lyon, France
Rue Royale, Paris, France

See also
Royal Street, New Orleans, United States
Royal Road (disambiguation)